Main line railway preservation is the practice of operating preserved trains on a railway network which is also operational primarily for serious commercial use. This is in contrast to a heritage railway, which is kept primarily for the use of preserved trains.

See also 
 Preserved main line steam locomotive support in the United Kingdom

Rail transport preservation